Death in the Land of Encantos is a Filipino experimental film co-produced, edited, written and directed by Lav Diaz. At 540 minutes (9 hours), it is among the longest films ever made. Awarded the NETPAC Prize, Best Asian Feature at the Jogja Asian Film Festival, the Jeonju FIPRESCI Prize, and Special Mention Orizzonti Prize in the Venice International Film Festival.

Cast

Gian anciro as Benjamin
Angeli Bayani as Catalina
Perry Dizon as Teodoro
Dante Perez as Mang Claro / Interviewer
Sophia Aves as Amalia
Soliman Cruz as Torturer
Gemma Cuenca as Carmen
At Maculangan as Father

Reception
Writing for Cinema Scope Magazine, Robert Koehler praised the film, stating "It’s a cinema viewing experience without parallel, exactly recreating what happens if one were to stand in a large landscape and wait for a person to arrive from the extreme distance."

Awards and nominations

References

External links
 

2007 films
2000s Tagalog-language films
Philippine independent films
Films directed by Lav Diaz
Philippine crime drama films
Philippine avant-garde and experimental films
2007 independent films